The 2012 season is New Radiant Sports Club's 33rd year in existence as a football club.

Background
New Radiant finished at the 4th position of last year's Dhivehi League, 4th in FA Cup as they were beaten in the third place play-off match and as runners-up of the President's Cup.

Club appointed Ali Waheed, as the new chairman of the club and he appointed the team skipper Ahmed Thoriq as the club's new general secretary.

On 7 January 2012, club decided to establish a youth academy this year.

New Radiant signed Ibrahim Fazeel, Ali Ashfaq, Ali Umar and Imran Mohamed to strengthen club's goal, midfield and attack for the 2012 season, while Ahmed Niyaz and Adam Shareef renewed their contract with the club.

Ashfaq's signing was a Maldivian record signing of MVR 1.4 million.

Sobah Mohamed, Fareed Mohamed, Mohamed Jameel and Charles Wright Gaye left the club ang joined VB Addu FC.

They also signed 2 Nigerian defenders, Kudus Omolade Kelani and Kingsley Chukwudi Nkurumeh before the start of the season.

Club announced the signing of Ahmed Afrad, Mohamed Hussain and Ivan Karamanov during the mid-season break.

Kit
Supplier: MediaNet / Sponsor: Milo
Source: Haveeru Online (Dhivehi)

Friendlies

Mid-season

Competitions

Overall

Competition record

*Draws include knockout matches decided on penalty kicks.

Dhivehi League

League table

Rules for classification: 1) points; 2) goal difference; 3) number of goals scored.

1 Maziya S&RC qualified for the 2013 AFC Cup as they won the 2012 Maldives FA Cup.
Updated to games played on 6 October 2012.
Source: RSSSF.com

Matches

FA Cup

President's Cup

See also
List of unbeaten football club seasons

References

New Radiant S.C. seasons